South Australian Forestry Corporation (trading as ForestrySA) is a business enterprise owned by the Government of South Australia which is responsible for management of publicly owned plantation forests in South Australia including the commercial production of timber and the management of forests for non-commercial purposes such as community use and as protected areas.

History
The South Australian Forestry Corporation was established on 1 January 2001 under the South Australian Forestry Corporation Act 2000 from the assets remaining from former government entities such as the former Department of Woods and Forests.

The corporation operates under the name ForestrySA which was previously used as the name of a unit within the former South Australian government department, the Department for Administrative and Information Services.

Purpose

Generally
ForestrySA has responsibility for the management of forestry reserves in three parts of South Australia which it describes in its publications as “regions” with the following names - Green Triangle Region, Mount Lofty Ranges Forest Reserves and the Northern Forests Region.

Commercial operations
As a commercial operator, ForestrySA is responsible for the management of plantation forests in the Green Triangle region for the on behalf of the plantation owner, OneFortyOne Plantations Pty Ltd, and in the Mount Lofty Ranges and Northern Forest regions on behalf of the Government of South Australia. The focus of the commercial operation is the production of log and chip, which is used to produce the following products - sawn timber, pulp, paper and posts.
The Green Triangle region operation will be reduced from 17 October 2017 when responsibility for plantation management is transferred to OneFortyOne Plantations Pty Ltd.

Non-commercial operations
ForestrySA is required by its charter to manage the following non-commercial activities:
native forest management
Community use of forests
Forestry industry development
Community protection (Including fire) and forest industry support activities
Other activities as directed by the Minister of Forests
Management of the Mid North forests

Forestry assets under management
As of 2014, ForestrySA was responsible for a total of thirteen forests in its three regions.

Green Triangle Region
Noolook Forest located north-east of Robe.
Mount Burr Forest located east of Millicent.
Mount Gambier Forest located south-west of Mount Gambier.
Penola Forest located south-west of Penola.
Comaum Forest located between Naracoorte in the north and Penola in the south.
Myora Forest located south-east of Mount Gambier.

Mount Lofty Ranges Forest Reserves
The Mount Lofty Ranges Forest Reserves consists of the three following forests located in the Mount Lofty Ranges and covering an approximate area of :

Northern Forests Region	
The Northern Forests Region (also called the Mid North Region) consists of the four following forests:

Corporate governance
Forestry SA as the statutory corporation established in 2001 by the South Australian Forestry Corporation Act 2000 operates as “a business enterprise with the principal responsibility of managing plantation forests for the benefit of the people and economy of the State.”  The operation is overseen by a board which is responsible to the South Australian Minister of Forests as per the “Act” and to both the minister and to the South Australian Treasurer as per a charter enacted in 2014 following the sale of three crops of timber (known as “three forward rotations”) from plantations in the Green Triangle region to OneFortyOne Plantations Pty Ltd in 2012.

See also
Forests of Australia
Protected areas of South Australia
Australasian Fire and Emergency Service Authorities Council

Citations and references

Citations

References

External links
Forestry SA website

F
Forestry agencies in Australia
Protected area administrators of Australia